Rashtabad-e Jadid (also Romanized as Rashtābād-e Jadīd) is a village in Azghan Rural District, in the Central District of Ahar County, East Azerbaijan Province, Iran. At the 2006 census, its population was 42, in 7 families.

References 

Populated places in Ahar County